Thomas Haig Purdie (1854 – 27 December 1929) was a Scottish football fullback who played for Heart of Midlothian.

Hearts

Purdie played for Hearts between 1874 and 1881 and made 61 appearances for the club.

He was one of the founders of Heart of Midlothian. He was also the first ever captain of Hearts.

Death

Tom Purdie died in a nursing home in Davidson's Mains, Edinburgh on 27 December 1929.

References

Heart of Midlothian F.C. players
Scottish footballers
Association football fullbacks
1854 births
1929 deaths
Footballers from Edinburgh
Date of birth missing